Energy in Japan refers to energy and electricity production, consumption, import and export in Japan. The country's primary energy consumption was 477.6 Mtoe in 2011, a decrease of 5% over the previous year.

The country lacks significant domestic reserves of fossil fuel, except coal, and must import substantial amounts of crude oil, natural gas, and other energy resources, including uranium. Japan relied on oil imports to meet about 84 percent of its energy needs in 2010. Japan was also the first coal importer in 2010, with 187 Mt (about 20% of total world coal import), and the first natural gas importer with 99 bcm (12.1% of world total gas import). As of 2019, 88% of Japan's power was produced by fossil fuels. On 22 October 2021, Japan declared its intention to reduce carbon emissions to 50% of that in 2013 by 2030 and achieve carbon neutrality by 2050. Japan produced 1004.8 TWh of electricity in 2021, close to 4% of the electricity generated in the world and 8% of that in Asia-Pacific (3rd largest behind China and India). Japan consumed 17.03 EJ, 3% of the world's consumption and 7% of Asia-Pacific's consumption (3rd largest behind China and India).

While Japan had previously relied on nuclear power to meet about 30% of its electricity needs, after the 2011 Fukushima Daiichi nuclear disaster, all nuclear reactors were progressively shut down for safety concerns. As of January 2022 there are 33 operable nuclear reactors in Japan, of which 10 reactors are currently operating.

Overview

History
Japan's rapid industrial growth since the end of World War II doubled the nation's energy consumption every five years into the 1990s. During the 1960–72 period of accelerated growth, energy consumption grew much faster than GNP, doubling Japan's consumption of world energy. By 1976, with only 3% of the world's population, Japan was consuming 6% of global energy supplies.

Compared with other nations, electricity in Japan is relatively expensive, and, since the loss of nuclear power after the earthquake and tsunami disaster at Fukushima, the cost of electricity has risen significantly.

Energy sources
In 1950, coal supplied half of Japan's energy needs, hydroelectricity one-third, and oil the rest. By 2001, the contribution of oil had increased to 50.2% of the total, with rises also in the use of nuclear power and natural gas. Japan now depends heavily on imported fossil fuels to meet its energy demand.

Oil
In the wake of the two oil crises of the 1970s (1973 and 1979), Japan made efforts to diversify energy resources in order to increase security. While the country's use of oil declined, its use of nuclear power and Natural gas rose substantially. Several Japanese industries, for example electric power companies and steelmakers, switched from petroleum to coal, most of which is imported. Japan's proved oil reserves total an estimated 44 million barrels.

The Japanese SPR is run by the Japan Oil, Gas and Metals National Corporation. Japan was the fifth-largest oil consumer and fourth-largest crude oil importer in the world in 2019.

Oil demand has been waning in Japan, especially leading up to and since the Tohoku earthquake in 2011.
While oil consumption was over 5 million barrels per day (bpd) for decades, this had declined to 3.22 million bpd by 2017.  
As of 2016, India, Saudi Arabia and Texas have overtaken Japan in oil consumption.  A further decline to 3.03 mln bpd or just under 176 million kiloliters (preliminary) was posted in 2018.  Crude consumption further declined during first half of 2020 to 303/141 = 2.15 million bpd, but that figure probably doesn't include refined products that are directly increasingly imported rather than converted.

Natural gas
Japan ranked as the world's largest importer of liquefied natural gas.

Because domestic natural gas production is minimal, rising demand is met by greater imports. Japan's main LNG suppliers in 2016 were Australia (27%), Malaysia (18%), Qatar (15%), Russia (9%), and Indonesia (8%).  In 1987, suppliers were Indonesia (51.3%), Malaysia (20.4%), Brunei (17.8%), United Arab Emirates (7.3%), and the United States (3.2%). In 2017, Japan consumed 4.7 quadrillion Btu (1377 TWh) of imported methane.

The new Japanese LNG strategy published in May 2016 envisages the creation of a liquid market and an international LNG hub in Japan. This promises to radically change the traditional JCC (crude oil) based pricing system in Japan, but also potentially in the Pacific Basin as a whole. But the path to hub creation and hub pricing in the early 2020s envisaged by the Strategy will not be straightforward.

Coal
As of 2019, a third of the electricity in Japan was generated from coal and is the third-largest importer of coal behind China and India in 2019. Government targets aimed to reduce that proportion to a quarter through closure of older, less efficient coal power plants. Twenty-two new coal plants were planned for the years 2020 to 2025. In 2017, Japan consumed 4.738 quadrillion Btu (1,388 TWh) of imported coal. In July 2020, the minister of Industry, Hiroshi Kajiyama, announced that around 100 coal plants would be shut down by 2030.

Nuclear power

Following Eisenhower's Atoms for Peace speech, the United States helped Japan develop their nuclear power program. When Japan decided to embark on the nuclear power field, it imported technology from the United States and obtained uranium from Canada, France, South Africa, and Australia. The first nuclear reactor was commissioned in 1966, from then to 2010, 54 more nuclear reactors had opened, with total generation capacity of 48,847 MW. The ratio of nuclear power generation to total electricity production increased from 2% in 1973 to around 30% in March 2011. During the 1980s, Japan's nuclear power program was strongly opposed by environmental groups, particularly after the Three Mile Island accident in the United States. In the 2000s, Japan had a few  of the modern Advanced Boiling Water Reactor, including some of the first new advanced Generation III reactors. At Rokkasho, Aomori a facility was built to enrich nuclear fuel, deal with nuclear waste, and recycle spent nuclear fuel.

After the 2011 earthquake and tsunami, some nuclear reactors were damaged, causing much uncertainty and fear about the release of radioactive material, as well as highlighting the ongoing concerns over seismic design standards (see Nuclear power in Japan §Seismicity). 
On 5 May 2012, Japan shut down the last nuclear reactor, the first time there has been no nuclear power production since 1970.
On 16 June Prime Minister Yoshihiko Noda ordered the restart of Ōi nuclear plant's reactors number 3 and 4, saying that people's livelihood needs to be protected.
Ōi nuclear plant's reactor No. 3 was restarted on 2 July, and No. 4 began operation on 21 July. However, in September 2013 the Ōi nuclear plant was shut down in order to have extensive safety inspections performed. By late 2015, both of the Sendai Nuclear Power Plant's reactors had reopened and restarted producing nuclear energy. Other nuclear plants, such as the Takahama Nuclear Power Plant, have received permission to reopen, and other nuclear reactors are beginning the process of restarting.

In June 2015, the Japanese government released an energy proposal that includes the revival of nuclear power to account for Japan's energy needs. The proposal calls for an increase of about 20% in nuclear energy by 2030. This reverses a decision by the previous Democratic Party, the government will re-open nuclear plants, aiming for "a realistic and balanced energy structure".

Currently operating reactors are:

 Sendai Nuclear Power Plant on 11 August 2015 Unit 1 was restarted, followed by Unit 2 on 1 November 2015. 
 Ōi Nuclear Power Plant's on 14 March 2018 Unit 3 was restarted, followed by Unit 4 on 9 May 2018. 
 Genkai Nuclear Power Plant on 23 March 2018 Unit 3 was restarted, followed by Unit 4 in June 2018.
 Takahama Nuclear Power Plant on 22 May 2017 Unit 4 was restarted, followed by Unit 3 on 6 June 2017.
 Mihama Nuclear Power Plant on 23 June 2021, Unit 3 was restarted.
 Ikata Nuclear Power Plant on 2 December 2021 Unit 3 was restarted.

Following the Fukushima disaster, the general public has opposed the use of nuclear energy.

Renewables
Japan currently produces about 10% of its electricity from renewable sources. The Fourth Strategic Energy Plan set the renewable share goal to be 24% by 2030. In the next 15 years, Japan intends on investing $700 billion into renewable energy. One initiative the Japanese government has implemented in order to boost the amount of renewable energy produced and purchased in Japan is the feed-in tariff scheme. The scheme encourages companies to invest in renewable energy by providing set prices for various types of renewable energy. The initiatives appear to be working, as renewable energy generation capacity now stands at 26.2 GW, compared to 20.9 GW in 2012.

On 3 July 2018, Japan's government pledged to increase renewable energy sources, including wind and solar, from 15% to 22–24% by 2030. Nuclear energy will provide 20% of the country's energy needs as an emissions-free energy source. This will help Japan meet climate change commitments.

In October 2021 Japan's cabinet approved a new target of 36-38% of renewable share in power generation by 2030. The nuclear target of 20-22% remained unchanged.

Hydroelectricity

The country's main renewable energy source is hydroelectricity, with an installed capacity of about 27 GW and a production of 69.2 TWh of electricity in 2009.
As of September 2011, Japan had 1,198 small hydropower plants with a total capacity of 3,225 MW. The smaller plants accounted for 6.6 percent of Japan's total hydropower capacity. The remaining capacity was filled by large and medium hydropower stations, typically sited at large dams. Cost per kilowatt-hour for power from smaller plants was high at ¥15–100, hindering further development of the energy source.

Solar power

Japan was the world's second largest producer of photovoltaic electricity in the early 2000s, although solar was a very minor contribution to the total at that time. The country was overtaken by Germany in 2005, a year in which Japan had 38% of the world supply compared to Germany's 39%. 
Since then, Japan had been slow to increase solar capacity compared to other countries until 2012.

On 1 July 2012, after the nuclear disaster at Fukushima, new tariffs for renewable energy were introduced by the Japanese government. 
The tariffs, set at ¥42 per kWh over the next 20 years to solar power producers, were among the highest in the world.
With the incentives in place, Japan added 1,718 MW of solar power in 2012. By the end of the year, Japan's total solar capacity was 7.4 GW.
Japan has seen sustained growth of solar PV capacity after 2012, reaching a cumulative installed capacity of 34 GW by the end of 2015, generating 3.5% of the national electricity consumption in that year.

Wind power

Japan had 1,807 wind turbines with a total capacity of 2440 MW as of September 2011. Lack of locations with constant wind, environmental restrictions, and emphasis by power utilities on fossil and nuclear power hinders the employment of more wind power in the country. However, it has been estimated that Japan has the potential for 144 GW for onshore wind and 608 GW of offshore wind capacity.

Geothermal energy

Of other renewable energy sources, Japan has partially exploited geothermal energy. The country had six geothermal power stations with a combined capacity of 133 megawatts in 1989.  By 2011, the country had 18 geothermal plants. Japan has the third largest geothermal reserves in the world, and geothermal energy in particular is being heavily focused on as a source of power following the Fukushima disaster and subsequent shutdown of all nuclear reactors. The Ministry of Economy, Trade, and Industry is currently exploring over 40 locations to see if geothermal energy plants would be compatible.

Waste and biomass energy
As of September 2011, Japan had 190 generators attached to municipal waste units and 70 independent plants using biomass fuel to produce energy. In addition, 14 other generators were used to burn both coal and biomass fuel. In 2008, Japan produced 322 million tons of biomass fuel and converted 76% of it into energy.

Ocean energy
In 2012, the government announced plans to build experimental tidal power and wave power plants in coastal areas.  Construction on the projects, the locations for which have not been determined, would begin in 2013.

Electricity sector

In 2014, Japan ranked fifth in the world by electricity production, after the United States, China, Russia, and India with 934 TWh produced during that year. It is estimated that Japan's net electricity generation was at about 950 terawatthours (TWh) in 2019 and has declined overall by about 11% since 2010. In 2019, Japan's net electricity generation decreased nearly 4% from the 2018 level as a result of warm winter weather and lower industrial output.

In terms of per capita electricity consumption, the average person in Japan consumed 8,459 kWh in 2004 compared to 14,240 kWh for the average American. In that respect it ranked 18th among the countries of the world. Its per capita electricity consumption increased by 21.8% between 1990 and 2004.

Japan had 282 GW of total installed electricity generating capacity in 2010, the third largest in the world behind the United States and China. However, after the damage by the 2011 earthquake, capacity is estimated to be around 243 GW in mid-2011. It was one of the world's largest users of solar energy, in fourth place behind Germany, Italy, and China. With 53 active nuclear power generating reactor units in 2009, that year Japan ranked third in the world in that respect, after the United States (104 reactors) and France (59). Almost one quarter (24.93%) of its electricity production was from nuclear plants, compared to 76.18% for France and 19.66% for the United States. However, after the 2011 Tōhoku earthquake and tsunami and the subsequent Fukushima Daiichi nuclear disaster, all plants eventually shut down in May 2012 and Ōi Nuclear Power Plant was restarted and operational between June 2012 and September 2013. On 11 August 2015 and 1 November 2015, the two nuclear reactor of the Sendai Nuclear Power Plant were restarted respectively.

Since the generation disruption caused by the Fukushima disaster, rapid steps have been made to liberalize the electricity supply market. One way this was done in Japan is through the feed-in-tariff scheme. This was announced in 2012 as a direct consequence of the Fukushima disaster. The feed-in-tariff scheme encourages utility operators and companies to purchase and invest in renewable energy. The Ministry of Economy, Trade and Industry set prices for various renewable energy sources to encourage the production and consumption of renewable energy. In April 2016 domestic and small business customers became able to select from over 250 supplier companies competitively selling electricity. Also wholesale electricity trading on the Japan Electric Power Exchange has been encouraged.

National grid
Unlike most other industrial countries, Japan doesn't have a single national grid but instead has separate eastern and western grids. The standard voltage at power outlets is 100 V, but the grids operate at different frequencies: 50 Hz in Eastern Japan and 60 Hz in Western Japan. The grids are connected together by three frequency converter stations (Higashi-Shimizu, Shin Shinano and Sakuma), but these can only handle 1 GW in total. A converter station also exists at Minami-Fukumitsu.  The 2011 Tōhoku earthquake and tsunami resulted in 11 reactors being taken offline with a loss of 9.7GW. The three converter stations did not have the capacity to transfer enough power from Japan's western power grid to significantly help the eastern grid.

The two grids were originally developed by separate companies. Tokyo Electric Light Co was established in 1883, which also established electric power in Japan. In 1885, demand had grown enough that TELCO bought generation equipment from AEG of Germany. 
The same happened in the western parts of Japan with General Electric being the supplier to Osaka Electric Lamp. GE's equipment used the US standard 60 Hz, while AEG's equipment used the European standard of 50 Hz.

Utilities
In Japan, the electricity market is divided into 10 regulated companies:

 Chugoku Electric Power Company (CEPCO/ENERGIA)
 Chubu Electric Power (Chuden)
 Hokuriku Electric Power Company (Hokuden)
 Hokkaido Electric Power Company (HEPCO)
 Kyushu Electric Power (Kyuden)
 Kansai Electric Power Company (KEPCO)
 Okinawa Electric Power Company (Okiden)
 Tokyo Electric Power Company (TEPCO)
 Tohoku Electric Power (Tohokuden)
 Shikoku Electric Power Company (Yonden)

Hydrogen energy
In March 2016, METI set a target of 40,000 hydrogen fuel-cell vehicles on Japan's roads by 2020 and 160 fueling stations.

Carbon emissions

See also

Electricity sector in Japan
Energy Law (Japan)
Geothermal power in Japan
Hydroelectricity in Japan
Japan Electric Association
Japan Oil, Gas and Metals National Corporation
List of countries by energy consumption per capita
List of countries by total primary energy consumption and production
Renewable energy by country
Solar power in Japan
Wind power in Japan
World energy consumption

References

 – Japan

External links
 Agency for Natural Resources and Energy
Japan’s Energy White Paper 2017